Plumbocene is an organometallic compound of lead. It is a member of the class of metallocenes. It is soluble in benzene, acetone, ether, and petroleum ether, and insoluble in water. Plumbocene is stable in cold water.

Plumbocene is not commercially available. It may be synthesized by the reaction of sodium cyclopentadienide with a lead(II) source such as lead(II) nitrate or lead(II) iodide.

The decamethyl analog, Cp*2Pb, and the half-sandwich complexes, Cp*PbBF4 and Cp*PbCl, are known as well.

References

Metallocenes
Lead(II) compounds
Cyclopentadienyl complexes